Sheoraphuli (also called Seoraphuli) is a neighbourhood of Hooghly district in the Indian state of West Bengal. It is on West side of river hooghly. It is a part of the area covered by Kolkata Metropolitan Development Authority (KMDA).

Geography 
Sheoraphuli has an average elevation of 39 ft (11 m). Sheoraphuli has 218.70 km of total road length out of which 172.90 km is pucca.

Demographics 
The population of Sheoraphuli is 121081 as per the 2011 census report. Majority of the residents are Bengalis and major religion is Hindu. The literacy rate of Sheoraphuli is 98.05% which is higher than the national average of 74%(2011).

Transportation 
Sheoraphuli is well connected by road and rail. The Eastern Railway line has a station named Sheoraphuli railway station. Sheoraphuli is around 23 km north of Howrah. The Howrah-Bardhaman Main Line and Sheoraphuli-Tarakeswar Branch Line connect Sheoraphuli.                                                                        Sheoraphuli railway station: Daily Train UP - 140 and Down - 139.

State Highway 6/ Grand Trunk Road passes through Sheoraphuli. Private Bus number 2 (Chunchura Court - Dakshineswar) plies through here. Zaminder Road and Sarkarpaara-Mallickbagan-Piarapur Road connect G.T. Road to Delhi Road with just a 5 minutes difference in a two wheeler. State Highway 2 connects Sheoraphuli (Delhi Road) to Durgapur Expressway at Singur and National Highway 14 at Bishnupur.

There is a water transport service (Nemai Tirtha Ferry Service) in the Hooghly River that connects Sheoraphuli with Barrackpore on the opposite side of the river. Sheoraphuli Ferry ghat is just 2 minutes away from the railway station and bus stoppage. Ferry service is available from 6am until 11pm.

Nearest airport is the Netaji Subhash Chandra Bose International Airport in Dumdum, Kolkata and nearest airstrip is in Barrackpore (Barrackpore Air Force Station).

Utility services and media 

The Baidyabati Municipality (ESTD 1869) is the civic administrative body of Sheoraphuli which makes it 70th cleanest city of India as per National Urban Sanitation Policy. The Municipality administers an area of 12.09 km2 and supplies potable water to the city through underground pipe line. The pipe line has a length of 100 km and connects 45% of the total number of houses in this area. Electricity is supplied by the privately operated Calcutta Electric Supply Corporation (CESC) to the town region, and by the West Bengal State Electricity Board in the nearby Panchayat area. State-owned BSNL is the telephone and internet service provider in the town.

Economy 

Sheoraphuli is historically famous for its Bazaar (also called Sheoraphuli hat) which is one of the largest markets for raw commodities in the Hooghly district. The bazaar, situated at the riverside, is more than 250 years old. It also has a section for retail trading in zamindar road, the SBI main branch is also situated here. Zamindar Road is one of the oldest retail market in hooghly. There are several other super markets located at Sheoraphuli, primarily based on the two sides of G.T. Road. A few small and medium-sized factories are incorporated in here. There are few Banks along with ATM facilities serve the people living in Sheoraphuli and nearby areas. State Bank of India being the busiest of all has a branch at Jamindar Road and has two ATM counters. Other banks like Allahabad Bank, United Bank of India, UCO Bank, Indian Overseas Bank, Axis Bank Icici Bank, Bank of Baroda, HDFC Bank and the Baidyabati Sheoraphuli Co-operative Bank also have their presence here.

Education 

Sheoraphuli has a number of primary, secondary and higher secondary educational institutions. Schools mainly use English or Bengali as the medium of instruction. Following is the list of schools in this area.
 
 Pearl Rosary School (WBBSE, WBCHSE)
Sheoraphuli Surendra Nath Vidyaniketan
 Sheoraphuli Netaji Vidyamandir
 Vivekananda High School
 St. John's Academy
 Girindra Chandra Primary School
 Jagabandhu Mukherjee Girls High School
 Ambedkar Prathamik Vidyalaya
 Pearapore Paschimpara Prathamik Vidyalaya
 Pearapore Schoolmath Prathamik Vidyalaya
 Sheoraphuli Krishna Prasad Pal Vidyaniketan 
 Krishna Prasad Pal Memorial Teachers' Training College

Notable spots 

 Sheoraphuli Raj Debuttar Estate
 Udayan Cinema
 Nistarini Kalibari
 Sushma Cinema Hall
Sheoraphuli barabazar
Sheoraphuli Krishak bazar

Healthcare 

Sheoraphuli has an eye hospital called Disha eye hospital and two privately owned nursing homes namely Mamata nursing home and Dr. Ghosh nursing home.

Culture 
Sheoraphuli has two cinema halls, it has well established library, 6schools, one eye hospital. Sheoraphuli bazaar is renowned bazar in hooghly district. The Satyajit Ray Bhavana in Sheoraphuli is a government sponsored centre at Sheoraphuli for facilitating theater awareness. It has a large auditorium housed in an impressively architectured building. The building, besides being a modern theatrical complex, houses the Baidyabati Municipality. Nistarini Kalibari is a Hindu temple Situated on the bank of the Hooghly River, the presiding deity of the temple is Nistarini, an aspect of Kali. A bathing ghat on the river and several shops are also housed in the temple complex. Along the riverfront there are few other bathing ghats on the river which are crowded throughout the year.

References 

Cities and towns in Hooghly district
Neighbourhoods in Kolkata
Kolkata Metropolitan Area